Tlalchapa is a city and seat of the municipality of Tlalchapa, in the state of Guerrero, south-western Mexico. As of 2020, the city's population was 11,681.

In the 13th of March 2014, following a controversial court's order, more than sixty-thousand person protested in it.

References

Populated places in Guerrero